Grégoire Marche (born 3 March 1990 in Valence, Drôme) is a professional squash player who represents France. He reached a career-high world ranking of World No. 14 in November 2019.

He won the silver medal at the 2017 World Games in the Squash competition. He also won the silver medal in this event at the 2022 World Games.

References

External links 
 
 
 

1990 births
Living people
French male squash players
World Games medalists in squash
World Games silver medalists
Competitors at the 2017 World Games
Competitors at the 2022 World Games
Sportspeople from Valence, Drôme
20th-century French people
21st-century French people